Bruchidius nalandus, is a species of leaf beetle found in Congo, India, Indonesia, Iran, Kenya, South Africa, Sri Lanka,
United Arab Emirates, Vietnam and Socotra Island.

Description
The proximal sclerite of the saccus is triangular.

It is a seed borer commonly found in seeds of Crotalaria pallida, Phyllodium pulchellum, Tephrosia candida, Tephrosia apollinea and Tephrosia purpurea.

References 

Bruchinae
Insects of Sri Lanka
Beetles described in 1927